Gia Nghĩa is the capital city of Đắk Nông Province, in the Central Highlands of Vietnam. It is located on the main road northward to Buôn Ma Thuột.

Climate

References

Provincial capitals in Vietnam
Populated places in Đắk Nông province
Districts of Đắk Nông province
Cities in Vietnam